Berriedale can refer to:
Berriedale, Tasmania, in Hobart
Berriedale, Highland, Scotland, best known for the Berriedale Braes
Berriedale, Jamaica, in the area of Portland.

See also:
Berridale, New South Wales